Moncontour is a commune in the Côtes-d'Armor department of Brittany in northwestern France. The 18th-century French economist Joachim Faiguet de Villeneuve [1703–1781) was born in Moncontour. It is one of Les Plus Beaux Villages de France.

Population

Inhabitants of Moncontour are called moncontourais in French.

See also
Communes of the Côtes-d'Armor department

References

External links

Communes of Côtes-d'Armor